David Charles Erskine (1866 – 26 May 1922) was a British Liberal Party politician.

Background
He was the son of James Erskine of Linlathen, near Dundee. He was educated at Harrow School, France and Germany.

Career

He was Secretary to the Governor-General of Canada, John Hamilton-Gordon from 1897 to 1898.
He was Liberal MP for West Perthshire from 1906 to 1910. He was first elected in 1906, gaining his seat from the Liberal Unionist. He was appointed Parliamentary Secretary to the Secretary for Scotland, John Sinclair in 1906 and served in this position until 1910. He was appointed Chairman of the Board of Trustees for the National Galleries of Scotland in 1908 and continued in this role until his death. He stood down from parliament after one term in January 1910 and did not stand again. He served as a justice of the peace and was a deputy lieutenant.

He is buried in Brookwood Cemetery.

John Maynard Keynes
John Maynard Keynes added his name to his "sex list" in 1906. Keynes kept two diaries from 1901 to 1915 detailing every sexual encounter he had experienced, what they did, etc.

Sources
Who Was Who; http://www.ukwhoswho.com
British parliamentary election results 1885–1918, Craig, F. W. S.

References

External links 
 

1866 births
1922 deaths
Members of the Parliament of the United Kingdom for Scottish constituencies
UK MPs 1906–1910
Scottish Liberal Party MPs
LGBT members of the Parliament of the United Kingdom
Scottish LGBT politicians
Burials at Brookwood Cemetery
People educated at Harrow School
Politicians from Dundee